The 1959 Dunedin mayoral election was part of the New Zealand local elections held that same year. In 1959, elections were held for the Mayor of Dunedin plus other local government positions including twelve city councillors. The polling was conducted using the standard first-past-the-post electoral method.

Len Wright, the incumbent Mayor, declined to run for a fourth term. He was succeeded by councillor Stuart Sidey who defeated the Labour Party candidate Peter John Scott. The Citizens' Association won eight seats on the city council to the Labour Party's four.

Results
The following table shows the results for the election:

References 

Mayoral elections in Dunedin
Dunedin
Politics of Dunedin
1950s in Dunedin
November 1959 events in New Zealand